Coyote is an American comic book series created by Steve Englehart and Marshall Rogers.

Publication history
The characters first appeared in Eclipse Magazine #2-8. It would later be reprinted in a color trade paperback, I Am Coyote.

Afterwards, a new comic book series started at Marvel Comics Epic Comics line, that ran 16 issues. It was notable for the first published work of Todd McFarlane. According to Epic editor-in-chief Archie Goodwin, artist Steve Leialoha's departure after issue #2 caused deadline problems from which the series never fully recovered, leading to its early cancellation.

Collected editions
The original Eclipse & Epic series has been reprinted in a series of collections from Image Comics:
 Coyote Collection (reprints Eclipse Magazine #2-8, plus Scorpio Rose #1-3)
 Coyote Collection (reprints Coyote #1-4)
 Coyote Collection (reprints Coyote #5-8, including Djinn backup series)
 Coyote Collection (reprints Coyote #9-12, including Djinn & Scorpio Rose backup series)
 Coyote Collection (reprints Coyote #13-16, including Scorpio Rose backup series)

Notes

References

Coyote at the International Catalogue of Superheroes

External links
Coyote in Eclipse Monthly
Coyote comics
Coyote Collections

Defunct American comics
Eclipse Comics titles
Epic Comics titles
Image Comics titles
Comics by Steve Englehart
Comics by Todd McFarlane